Vamana temple (Devanagri:वामन मंदिर) is a Hindu temple dedicated to Vamana, an avatar of the god Vishnu. The temple was built between assignable to circa 1050-75. It forms part of the Khajuraho Group of Monuments, a UNESCO World Heritage Site.

Location
The temple is located in the eastern area of Khajuraho. It is situated about 200 meters to the north-east to Brahma Temple.

Architecture
It has a sanctum, vestibule, maha-mandapa with lateral transepts and an entrance-porch.

Gallery

References

External links 
 M.P. Tourism Website, Official Website of Madhya Pradesh State Tourism Corporation, Khajuraho
 Archaeological Survey of India, Bhopal Division, Index Page for Khajuraho - Chhatarpur 
 Archaeological Survey of India, Bhopal Division, Vamana Temple, Khajuraho

Hindu temples in Khajuraho
11th-century Hindu temples
Bundelkhand
Monuments and memorials in Madhya Pradesh
World Heritage Sites in Madhya Pradesh
Vamana temples